Sarab-e Sofla Rural District is in Babaheydar District of Farsan County, Chaharmahal and Bakhtiari province, Iran. At the census of 2006, its constituent villages were in the Central District. There were 7,147 inhabitants in 1,974 households at the following census of 2011, by which time Babaheydar District had formed with two rural districts and the city of Babaheydar as its center. At the most recent census of 2016, the population of the rural district was 6,413 in 1,863 households. The largest of its three villages was Filabad, with 4,656 people.

References 

Farsan County

Rural Districts of Chaharmahal and Bakhtiari Province

Populated places in Chaharmahal and Bakhtiari Province

Populated places in Farsan County

fa:دهستان سراب سفلي